Jean Angelo (born Jean-Jacques Barthélémy, 17 May 1888 - 26 November 1933) was a French film actor of silent movies and early talkies. He was often a leading man playing romantic or athletic roles. Angelo was born and died in Paris.

Filmography 

 1908: Le Trouvère by Albert Capellani
 1908: Salomé by Albert Capellani
 1908: The Assassination of the Duke of Guise (314m) by André Calmettes
 1909: Vengeance corse by René Chavance
 1909: La Légende du violoneux (235m) by Adolphe Adenis - Pierre
 1909: La Laide, conte hindou (195m) by Michel Carré - Iavèh
 1909:  by Michel Carré
 1910: Le Joueur de cornemuse by Charles Torquet - the bagpiper
 1910: Fra Diavolo by Albert Capellani - Fra Diavolo
 1910: La Folle des ruines - Production Pathe - - Yann
 1911: The Hunchback of Notre Dame (810m) by Albert Capellani
 1911: Les Mystères de Paris (1540m, in 4 parts) by Albert Capellani
 1911: La Générosité du mari (175m) - Production S.C.A.G.L - -L'amant
 1911: La Faute de la sœur aînée - Production S.C.A.G.L - - Cyprien, le fiancé
 1912: Les Millions de l'orpheline (570m) by Daniel Riche - Xavier by Pibrac
 1912: La Bien-aimée (La Douce Alsace) by Louis Le Forestier
 1912: Les Amours de la reine Élisabeth (1100m) by Louis Mercanton and Henri Desfontaines - Seymour
 1913: La Dernière heure
 1913: Le Bonheur par l'enfant (710m) - Production S.C.A.G.L -  André Miriam
 1913: L'Argent ne fait pas le bonheur (780m) - Production S.C.A.G.L - Dominique
 1913: Les Misérables (tourné en 4 époques: 1605m, 1605m, 1840m, 1840m) by Albert Capellani - Enjolras
 1914: Vendetta by Louis Mercanton and René Hervil
 1917: Par la vérité (1845m en 1 prologue et 4 parties) by Gaston Leprieur and Maurice by Féraudy
 1917: Mères françaises (1230m) by Louis Mercanton and René Hervil - Robert d'Urbesc
 1918: The Divine Sacrifice by George Archainbaud: David Carewe
 1918: L'Expiation or Le marquis by Vilbois (1800m, in 4 parts) by Camille de Morlhon
 1920:  (1300m) by André Hugon- Pierre and André Chantal
 1920: L'Atlantide (4000m) by Jacques Feyder : Le Capt. Morhange
 1921: Fromont jeune et Risler aîné (2000m, en deux époques) by Henry Krauss - Frantz Risler
 1921: L'Autre (2000m) by Roger by Châteleux - Richard Malcor
 1922:  (2200m) by Jean Legrand
 1922:  (1900m) by Léonce Perret: Le comte Guy de Maligny
 1922: La Riposte (1500m) by Victor Tourjansky - Pablo Soriano
 1923:  (2000m) by Victor Tourjansky - Muzio
 1924: Surcouf (Tourné en 8 époques : 1)"Le roi des corsaires", 2)"Les pontons Anglais", 3)"Les fiançailles tragiques", 4)"Un coeur de héros", 5)"La chasse à l'homme", 6)"La lettre à Bonaparte", 7)"La morsure du serpent", 8)"La réponse de Bonaparte". by Luitz-Morat - Robert Surcouf
 1924: L'Aventurier (1925m) by Maurice Mariaud  - Etienne Ranson
 1924:  (Die letzte Stunde) by Max Neufeld
 1925: Barocco (2750m) by Charles Burguet - Jean de Kérauden
 1925: Le Double amour (2000m) by Jean Epstein - Jacques prémont-Solène
 1925: Les Aventures by Robert Macaire (5000m, tourné en 5 époques) by Jean Epstein : Robert Macaire
 1926: Martyr (4600m, tourné en 4 époques) by Charles Burguet - Roger de mancel
 1926: La Fin de Monte-Carlo by Mario Nalpas and Henri Étiévant - Raphaël Montera
 1926: Nana (2800m, en 8 parties) by Jean Renoir: Le comte de Vandeuvres
 1927: Une java by Henry Roussel - Jean Charvel
 Marquitta (1927) (2400m) by Jean Renoir - Le prince Vlasco
 1927: Chantage (2750m) by Henri Debain: Le comte by Chincé
 1927: Two Under the Stars by Johannes Guter
 1928: La Ronde infernale by Luitz-Morat - Georges Gauthier
 1928: The Case of Prosecutor M by Rudolf Meinert and Giulio Antamoro - Mirzew
 1929: A Foolish Maiden by Luitz-Morat - Armaury
 1929: Monte Cristo (6200m, in two parts) by Henri Fescourt: Edmond Dantès
 1930: My Heart Incognito by Manfred Noa and André-Paul Antoine
 1930:  by Kurt Bernhardt and Jean Tarride: Le marquis de Sévigné
 1930: L'Enfant by l'amour by Marcel L'Herbier: Paul Rantz
 1931: La Dernière berceuse by Gennaro Righelli
 1931: Sergeant X by Vladimir Strijewski - Chardin
 1931: Atout cœur by Henry Roussell: Le comte Robert de Trembly-Matour
 1932: The Triangle of Fire by Edmond T. Gréville: L'inspecteur Brémont
 1932: L'Atlantide by Georg Wilhelm Pabst: Le capitaine Morhange
 1933: Trois balles dans la peau by Roger Lion: Maxime Dartois
 1933: Colomba by Jacques Séverac

External links

1888 births
1933 deaths
French male stage actors
French male film actors
French male silent film actors
Male actors from Paris
20th-century French male actors
Place of birth missing